St Michael and All Angels’ Church, Lesnewth is a  Grade II* listed parish church in the Church of England in Lesnewth, Cornwall.

History

The church dates from the 12th century. With the exception of the tower, it was rebuilt between 1865 and 1866 by James Piers St Aubyn at a cost of £700.  The contractor was Westlake and Cann.

Parish status

The church is in the Boscastle and Tintagel group of parishes which includes:

St Symphorian's Church, Forrabury
St Merteriana's Church, Minster
St Materiana's Church, Tintagel
St Denis’ Church, Otterham
St Julitta's Church, St Juliot
The Holy Family Church, Treknow
St Piran's Church, Trethevy
St Petroc's Church, Trevalga

References

Lesnewth
Lesnewth